Group G of the 2010 FIFA World Cup began on 15 June and ended on 25 June 2010. The group consisted of reigning Copa América champions Brazil, North Korea, the Ivory Coast and Portugal.

Brazil and Portugal were also drawn in the same group at the 1966 FIFA World Cup, their previous official World Cup match. In 1966, the Portuguese team defeated Brazil 3–1, thus eliminating the defending champions, to advance to the quarter-finals where they encountered and defeated North Korea (another team in Group G) 5–3 after trailing 0–3.

As winners of the group, Brazil advanced to play against Chile – runners-up in Group H – in the Round of 16, while Portugal – the Group G runners-up – met Spain, who won Group H. The Ivory Coast finished third in the group and North Korea finished bottom. The North Koreans had a goal difference of −11, the worst of any team at the tournament, largely due to the 7–0 defeat they suffered against Portugal; that match was Portugal's biggest-ever World Cup win and North Korea's heaviest-ever defeat. It was also the first time a live football match was broadcast on North Korean television.

Standings

Brazil advanced to play Chile (runners-up of Group H) in the round of 16.
Portugal advanced to play Spain (winners of Group H) in the round of 16.

Matches
All times local (UTC+2)

Ivory Coast vs Portugal

Brazil vs North Korea

Brazil vs Ivory Coast

Portugal vs North Korea

Portugal vs Brazil

North Korea vs Ivory Coast

References

Group G
Group
group
North Korea at the 2010 FIFA World Cup
Ivory Coast at the 2010 FIFA World Cup